Karin Frohner (born 29 May 1943) is a former Austrian figure skater who competed in ladies singles.  She finished ninth at the 1960 Winter Olympics and won the bronze medal at the European Figure Skating Championships in 1962.

Results

References
 Sports-Reference.com

Austrian female single skaters
Olympic figure skaters of Austria
Figure skaters at the 1960 Winter Olympics
1943 births
Living people
European Figure Skating Championships medalists